East Beach or East State Beach is a seaside public recreation area on Quonochontaug Neck, the narrow barrier island that separates Block Island Sound and Ninigret Pond, in the town of Charlestown, Rhode Island, United States. The state beach encompasses  of oceanfront and abuts Ninigret National Wildlife Refuge.

History
The recreational grounds were established as East Beach State Park in 1967. In 2006, the state began "setting up this natural reserve in a major way" with the addition of some  acquired through the purchase of four parcels at a cost of a little more than two million dollars.

Activities and amenities
The area offers a 20-unit seasonal campground, salt-water fishing, ocean swimming, and beach activities. It is open seasonally.

References

External links
East Beach Rhode Island Department of Environmental Management Division of Parks & Recreation

State parks of Rhode Island
Beaches of Rhode Island
Charlestown, Rhode Island
Protected areas of Washington County, Rhode Island
Beaches of Washington County, Rhode Island
1967 establishments in Rhode Island
Protected areas established in 1967